The Fan Museum, which opened in 1991, is the world's first museum dedicated to the preservation and display of hand fans. It is located within two grade II* listed houses that were built in 1721 within the Greenwich World Heritage Site on Croom's Hill in southeast London, England. Along with the museum, there is an orangery decorated with murals, a Japanese-style garden with a fan-shaped parterre, a pond, and a stream.

Overview
The museum owns over 5,000 fans and other fan-related cultural materials as of 2018. The oldest fan in the collection dates from the 11th century and the collection of 18th and 19th-century European fans is extensive. The entire collection is not displayed permanently due to conservation concerns, but there is a permanent educational display which teaches about fan history, manufacturing processes, and the various forms of fan. Exhibits include a fan with a built-in ear trumpet and one with a repair kit built into the design. Fan-making classes are also held at the Fan Museum. The Fan Museum also contains a reference library.

The Fan Museum is not publicly funded. National Trust members receive a discount on admission.

See also
 Greenwich Visitor Centre
 List of London museums
 The Hand Fan Museum, California, United States

References

Further reading

External links
The Fan Museum website

1991 establishments in England
Museums established in 1991
Museums in the Royal Borough of Greenwich
Fashion museums in the United Kingdom
Grade II* listed buildings in the Royal Borough of Greenwich
Grade II* listed museum buildings
Ventilation fans